Felix is a 1996 Slovenian drama film directed by Božo Šprajc. The film was selected as the Slovenian entry for the Best Foreign Language Film at the 69th Academy Awards, but was not accepted as a nominee.

Cast
 Dejan Acimovic
 Ivo Ban
 Peter Benedejcic
 Janez Hocevar
 Meto Jovanovski
 Polona Juh
 Petar Mircevski

See also
 List of submissions to the 69th Academy Awards for Best Foreign Language Film
 List of Slovenian submissions for the Academy Award for Best Foreign Language Film

References

External links
 

1996 films
1996 drama films
Slovene-language films
Slovenian drama films